The Federal Ministry for Economic Cooperation and Development, abbreviated BMZ, is a cabinet-level ministry of the Federal Republic of Germany. Its main office is at the former German Chancellery in Bonn with a second major office at the Europahaus in Berlin.

Founded in 1961, the Ministry works to encourage economic development within Germany and in other countries through international cooperation and partnerships. It cooperates with international organizations involved in development including the International Monetary Fund, World Bank, and the United Nations.

Under the overall lead of the BMZ, the agencies Deutsche Gesellschaft für Internationale Zusammenarbeit (GIZ) and Kreditanstalt für Wiederaufbau (KfW) are responsible for implementing bilateral co-operation, the bulk of Germany's official development assistance (ODA). According to the OECD, 2020 ODA from Germany increased by 13.7% to US$28.4 billion. For education and service purposes, Engagement Global gGmbH is subordinate to the ministry.

List 
Political Party:

References

Economic Cooperation And Development
International development agencies
Economy of Germany
Germany, Economic Cooperation And Development